The American Academy of Orthopaedic Surgeons (AAOS) is an orthopedic organization.   Founded at Northwestern University in 1933, as of 2015 AAOS had grown to include about 39,000 members. The group provides education and practice management services for orthopedic surgeons and allied health professionals. It also lobbies and works on public education. It describes itself as "the world's largest medical association of musculoskeletal specialists." It is a provider of musculoskeletal education to orthopaedic surgeons and others. Its continuing medical education activities include an annual meeting, multiple CME courses held around the country and at the Orthopaedic Learning Center, and various medical and scientific publications and electronic media materials.

AAOS Now
Monthly nonpeer-reviewed news magazine published by the AAOS.

Notable people
Philip D. Wilson Jr. – president, 1972
Joseph A. Bosco III, MD, FAAOS - president, 2020

References

External links
Official website

Surgical organizations based in the United States
Orthopedic organizations
Organizations established in 1933
Medical and health organizations based in Illinois